SWAT: Target Liberty is a 2007 tactical shooter  video game developed by 3G Studios and published by Vivendi Games exclusively for the PlayStation Portable.

Story 
Story takes place in New York City as SWAT officer Kurt Wolfe, at first, was assigned to take down renewed Asian gang violence led by ethnic Korean-Americans. But later on, he and his team discover that terrorist forces are planning to pin the blame on the North Korean government for the explosion of a nuclear weapon on American soil.

Players take command of Officer Kurt Wolfe and can take two additional members to every mission.

Gameplay 
Target Liberty features an isometric perspective, similar to Police Quest: SWAT 2, though the game leans toward a more arcade-like experience to better fit a handheld system.

Reception 

SWAT: Target Liberty received "mixed" reviews according to the review aggregation website Metacritic.

References

External links 

2007 video games
Multiplayer and single-player video games
PlayStation Portable games
PlayStation Portable-only games
Police Quest and SWAT
Tactical shooter video games
Third-person shooters
Video games about police officers
Video games developed in the United States